Melisa Akarsu (born 1993) is a Turkish swimmer competing in the butterfly events.

A member of Fenerbahçe Swimming in Istanbul, she is holder of national records in the 17-18 age category in 100 m butterfly with 1:02.02 and in 200 m butterfly with 2:17.00 set in June 2011.

Akarsu ranked 8th in the 200 m butterfly event at the 2012 European Short Course Swimming Championships held in Chartres, France.

She won one gold, one silver and one bronze medal at the 2013 Islamic Solidarity Games held in Palembang, Indonesia.

Achievements

See also
 Turkish women in sports

References

1993 births
Place of birth missing (living people)
Turkish female butterfly swimmers
Turkish female swimmers
Fenerbahçe swimmers
Living people
Swimmers at the 2013 Mediterranean Games
Mediterranean Games competitors for Turkey
20th-century Turkish sportswomen
21st-century Turkish sportswomen